FBJ may refer to:
 Baby Jet Airlines, the ICAO code FBJ
 Swedish Air Force Rangers or Flygbasjägarna, an elite specialist ground unit of the Swedish Air Force